Lane City or Mineral City was a settlement in White Pine County, Nevada. It is now a ghost town.

A mining camp was founded in 1869 just west of Ely, Nevada, and named Mineral City until 1876. Since Mineral City lay on the Central Overland Route, a stagecoach stop followed, and by 1872, the boomtown had a post office and more than 600 inhabitants. In 1896 the town was renamed Lane City for Charles D. Lane, following his purchase of Chainman, a major local mining and milling operation. Lane City continued into the twentieth century, but as of 2014 the town (lying along what is now US 50) is abandoned and only a few structures and foundations remain.

References

Ghost towns in Nevada
White Pine County, Nevada
Populated places established in 1869
1869 establishments in Nevada